An ethnic exogroup is a group of people which does not belong to a particular ethnic group. Many cultures have terms referring to all outsiders, but in practice this often becomes narrowed to the largest outsider group. In particular, exogroup terms used by minorities in a particular country often become specific to the majority in that country rather than applying to other minorities as well. Exogroup terms are sometimes considered to be derogatory, depending on the word and the context and manner in which it is used. They may be distinguished from ethnic or religious slurs in that they do not necessarily designate a specific group, and instead target all who do not belong to a specific group.

A
Ajam
(Arabic; عجم) Literally: mumbler, a person who cannot speak proper Arabic. A traditional term for non-Arabs (literally as those who cannot speak, or cannot be understood), often specifically applied to Persians. Derogatory implications depend on context.
Ajnabi
(Arabic; اجنبی) Literally: Stranger, not friend, far away, alien and declined. Traditionally used for westerners
Allochtoon
A Dutch term (from the Greek ἀλλος-allos) that literally means "originating from another country". Refers to both immigrants and their descendants. Officially refers to any person with at least one immigrant parent. Not usually considered offensive.
Ausländer
(Ausländer) is a German word meaning foreigner or alien.

B
Bilagáana 
(Bilagáana) is the Navajo word for white people or people of European descent.

F
Farang
(Thai) A generic term for foreigner used to refer to those of European ancestry and can be used to refer to plants or animals that are foreign in origin as an adjective. The word Farang derives - via tenth century Arabic and then Persian - from Frank, referring to the Germanic people that gave their name to modern France.
Farangi
A Persian term for foreigner. The word may derive from Franks. May have derogatory connotations.

G
Gaijin
(Japanese; 外人) Literally 'out person', usually used in context to refer someone who is ethnically not Japanese. Considered politically incorrect and often derogatory by those it refers to. The politically correct term for a foreigner is "Gaikokujin". Because Japanese is a highly contextual language, it is possible to use the word "Gaijin" without derogatory intent; however, "Gaikokujin" is highly preferred to remain politically correct and avoid misunderstanding.
Gentile
Term used in English principally to mean "non-Jew". Gentile derives from Latin 'Gentes/Gentilis' a word which originally meant "people" or "tribe" but which evolved in the early Christian era to refer to a non-Jew. In Hebrew the word goy (see below) followed the same journey over same period: also evolving from meaning "nation" or tribe" to mean non-Jew.
Giaour
(Turkish; gâvur) Also spelled Ghiaour or Gavur, a generic term for a non-Muslim or non-Turk, often used specifically for Christians, particularly the local Greeks and Armenians. Modern use is widespread, and not always considered derogatory.
Gadjo
(Romany) A Romany term meaning "house dweller," used to refer to a non-gypsy.
Goy
(Hebrew; גוי, plural goyim; גויים) Word used in Hebrew, Yiddish and English to mean a non-Jew, or gentile. The modern meaning of goy evolved from Biblical Hebrew: in the Bible goy means a nation or a tribe, and can refer to both the nation of Israel and other nations.
Gorbatti
(Nubian) A term for a Fellah or non-Nubian. It literally means the land worker and is used to refer to non-Nubians in Egyptian Nubia. The word is composed of two words, (Gor) which means land, and (batti) which means to work.
Gringo
(Spanish; Gringo feminine, gringa) A Spanish and Portuguese term used to refer to foreigners in Latin American countries, typically used to refer to those from English-speaking countries. It can be used, depending on country of origin, to mean any non-Spanish speaker, an Anglophone person, a light-haired or light skinned person, or a non-Iberian European.
Gweilo
(Cantonese) A Cantonese term literally meaning "ghost man" though often translated to English as foreign devil used to refer to Europeans in a derogatory manner.

H
Haole
(Hawaiian, pronounced: How-leh) A universal term for foreigner, can be used for people, plants or animals that are non-Hawaiian in origin. The phrase has been linked to anti-foreigner hate crimes in Hawaii.
Heathen
Refers to those who follow no religion, or those who are polytheistic, animistic or shamanic. It is usually considered pejorative.

K
Kaffir
(English, also in Dutch and Afrikaans, Portuguese equivalent cafre) The word kaffir, sometimes spelled kaffer or kafir, is an offensive term for a black person, most common in South Africa and other African countries. Generally considered a racial or ethnic slur. Derived from the Arabic "Kafir".

Kafir
(Arabic, كافر kāfir; plural كفّار kuffār) A non-Muslim or infidel, may include People of the Book depending on context. In Islamic sharia doctrine, Kafir are divided into dhimmi, harbi and musta'min. Not necessarily derogatory. 

 Kawaja
 (Sudanese Dinka) Used to refer to a purely white person with no black ancestry. Not derogatory in any usage.

M
Mawali
(Arabic; موالي) A classical term for a non-Arab Muslim. Fell out of use after the Abbasid revolution.

P
Palagi
(Samoan, pronounced Palangi) A term used throughout the South Pacific to refer to (typically Caucasian) non-Polynesian foreigners.
Pākehā
(Maori) A Maori term for non-Polynesians living in New Zealand, usually used for those of European descent specifically, though also used for non-Maori in general. In its narrower definition, acceptance of the term varies amongst those it describes. It is commonly used by a range of journalists and columnists from The New Zealand Herald, New Zealand's largest-circulation daily newspaper.  These include Garth George, a conservative Pakeha columnist, Rawiri Taonui, a Maori academic, and John Armstrong, a mainstream political columnist. It is accepted wholeheartedly by some of the people it describes, but others object to the term, considering it to be racist or otherwise offensive. It was dropped as a descriptive term from the 2001 census because of potential offence.

See also
 List of ethnic slurs
 List of religious slurs

References

Exogroups